Shelley Rigger is an American political scientist and author. She is professor of East Asian Politics at Davidson College.

Books
Politics in Taiwan: Voting for Democracy (Routledge, 1999)
From Opposition to Power: Taiwan’s Democratic Progressive Party (Lynne Rienner Publishers,2001)
Why Taiwan Matters: Small Island, Global Powerhouse (2011) 
The Tiger Leading the Dragon: How Taiwan Propelled China’s Economic Rise (2021)

References

Living people
Year of birth missing (living people)
Place of birth missing (living people)
American women political scientists
American political scientists
American political writers
American women writers
Davidson College faculty